Sir John Sydney Wardlaw-Milne KBE (1879 – 11 July 1967) was a British Conservative Party politician and member of the Imperial Economic Committee.

Biography
He was born in 1879. He was elected at the 1922 general election as Member of Parliament (MP) for Kidderminster, and held the seat until his defeat at the 1945 general election.
Wardlaw-Milne was often seen as being on the right wing of the Conservative Party and during the tough economic times of the early 1930s, Wardlaw-Milne recommended that free education should be abolished.

Vote of no confidence 
During June–July 1942 Sir John was involved in an attempt to force Winston Churchill out in a vote of no confidence. The vote followed what Churchill in his war memoirs called "a long succession of misfortunes and defeats". The Conservative politician Robert Boothby, appearing in Martin Gilbert's documentary on Churchill's life, said, "It was the only time in the whole of the war that I saw him [Churchill] looking really anxious, because the only thing in the world he feared was Parliament." Wardlaw-Milne proposed the vote of no confidence on Churchill's running of the war. His speech, according to biographer Roy Jenkins, was "a fiasco." According to Jenkins, Wardlaw-Milne felt that operation of the war should be turned over to
a dominating figure to run the war and also a generalissimo to command all the armed forces.  It was not clear whether Milne wanted them to be the same person....  However, it did not greatly matter for he turned his whole argument into bathos by nominating the Duke of Gloucester, the third son of George V, for either or both of these jobs."

Gloucester was regarded as "a figure of fun" and "[t]he idea that he could be turned into a dominating warrior prince scuppered both his own and Wardlaw-Milne's reputations"  Churchill's own assessment was that "the combination of a Supreme War Commander with almost unlimited powers and his association with a Royal Duke seemed to have some flavour of dictatorship about it".

The final vote on the proposal, on 1 July 1942, was 475 to 25 in favor of Churchill's government. Jenkins gives the vote as 477 to 27, including tellers.

Death
He died on 11 July 1967.

Honours 
For his political and public services, Wardlaw-Milne was made a Knight Commander of the Civil Division of the Most Excellent Order of the British Empire on 31 May 1932.

Footnotes

References 

 at Leigh Rayment's Peerage Pages
Jenkins, Roy. Churchill: A Biography.  New York:  Farrar, Straus and Giroux, 2001.

External links 
 

1879 births
1967 deaths
Conservative Party (UK) MPs for English constituencies
UK MPs 1922–1923
UK MPs 1923–1924
UK MPs 1924–1929
UK MPs 1929–1931
UK MPs 1931–1935
UK MPs 1935–1945